Mabul (also known as The Flood) is a 2010 Israeli drama film starring Ronit Elkabetz and directed by Guy Nattiv. It is a feature-length extension of a previous short film by Nattiv.

On July 26, 2010, it was nominated for several Ophir Awards, including Best Film and Best Actress (Elkabetz). The film was shown at the San Francisco Jewish Film Festival in 2011.

Plot
Yoni's Bar Mitzvah approaches but his family continues to disintegrate as his parents prepare to separate. Things take a turn when Yoni's autistic older brother returns to the family home and challenges the family to reconcile and put an end to their dysfunctional ways in time for Yoni's Bar Mitzvah celebration.

Cast
Ronit Elkabetz as Miri Roshko
Michael Moshonov as Tomer Roshko
Tzahi Grad as Gidi Roshko
Yoav Rotman as Yoni Roshko

References

External links
 
 

2010 films
Israeli drama films
2010s Hebrew-language films
2010 drama films
Features based on short films
Films about autism
Films shot in Israel